XHPR-FM may refer to:

XHPR-FM (Poza Rica, Veracruz), FM Globo 102.7 FM and 1020 AM
XHPR-FM (Veracruz, Veracruz), Soy 101.7 FM

See also
XHPRS-FM, 105.7 Max FM, in Tecate, Baja California